Crassispira ballenaensis is a species of sea snail, a marine gastropod mollusk in the family Pseudomelatomidae. The parent species of Crassispira ballenaensis is the Crassispira Swainson.

Description
The length of the shell attains 33 mm.

Distribution
This marine species occurs from Tenacatita Bay, Pacific Mexico to Costa Rica.

References

 Hertlein, L. G. and A. M. Strong. 1951. Eastern Pacific expeditions of the New York Zoological Society. XLIII. Mollusks from the west coast of Mexico and Central America. Part X. New York Zoological Society, Zoologica 36(2): 66 120, 11 pls.

External links
 Biolib.cz: Crassispira ballenaensis
 
 

ballenaensis
Gastropods described in 1951